Minnesota State Highway 45 (MN 45) is a short  highway in northeast Minnesota, which runs from its intersection with State Highway 210 (Chestnut Avenue) and Carlton County Road 1 in the city of Carlton and continues north to its northern terminus at its interchange with Interstate 35 and Carlton County Highway 45 in the city of Scanlon. The route passes through the city of Carlton.

Route description
State Highway 45 serves as a short connector route between Carlton, Scanlon, and Interstate 35 in northeast Minnesota. It maintains Minnesota Constitutional Route 1 through the city of Carlton, following the historic route of former U.S. Highway 61.

Highway 45 parallels the Saint Louis River.

Jay Cooke State Park is located 3 miles east of the junction of Highways 45 and 210 at Carlton.  The park entrance is located on Highway 210 adjacent to Thomson.

Highway 45 is also known as Third Street N in the city of Carlton.

The route has a junction with Carlton County Road 3 (Carlton Road) at the northern city limits of Carlton.

History
State Highway 45 does not currently include any of its original marked extent.  The surviving segment of State Highway 45 (from Carlton to Scanlon) was part of the original U.S. Highway 61 from 1934 to 1968.  The route was paved as early as 1929.

The route originally designated State Highway 45 from 1934 to 1995 is the old extension of this route west of Interstate 35 between Scanlon and downtown Cloquet.  This section was turned back to Carlton County / city of Cloquet maintenance  and is now designated as County Highway 45.

Major intersections

References

045
Transportation in Carlton County, Minnesota
U.S. Route 61